Vredens Tid (Age of Wrath) is the fourth studio album by the Viking metal band Månegarm. It was released in 2005.

Track listing

External links
 Månegarm's official website

Månegarm albums
2005 albums